Skeleton returned to the program of the Winter Olympic Games for the first time in 54 years at the 2002 Games in Salt Lake City, Utah.  This was the first time Olympic competitions in skeleton were held during an Olympics outside of St. Moritz. Both men and women competed, with women competing for the first time in Olympic history. Medals were awarded after five runs down the course.  Both events were contested on February 20.

Medal summary

Medal table

Participating NOCs 
Nineteen nations competed in the skeleton events at Salt Lake City.

References

External links
Official Results Book – Skeleton

 
2002 Winter Olympics events
2002
2002 in skeleton